Ataurrehman, also known as Ataur Rahman and Ata Ur Rehman, is an Indian politician and a member of the Sixteenth Legislative Assembly of Uttar Pradesh in India. He represents the Baheri constituency of Uttar Pradesh and is a member of the Samajwadi Party, a social democratic political party in India.

Early life and  education
Ataurrehman was born on 10 January 1968 in the family of Shafiq Ahmad in the Bareilly district of Uttar Pradesh, India. He completed Dimple in Engineering from Aligarh Muslim University in 1989.

Political career
Ataurrehman has been the MLA of the 16th Legislative Assembly of Uttar Pradesh. He represented the Baheri Assembly constituency and is a member of the Samajwadi Party, a social democratic political party founded by Mulayam Singh Yadav in India.

Posts held

See also
 Baheri (Assembly constituency)
 Sixteenth Legislative Assembly of Uttar Pradesh
 Uttar Pradesh Legislative Assembly

References 

Samajwadi Party politicians
Uttar Pradesh MLAs 2012–2017
21st-century Indian Muslims
People from Bareilly district
1968 births
Living people
Uttar Pradesh MLAs 2022–2027
Politicians from Bareilly